Kolbad-e Sharqi Rural District is a rural district (dehestan) in Kolbad District, Galugah County, Mazandaran Province, Iran. At the 2006 census, its population was 7,951, in 2,135 families. The rural district has 4 villages.

References 

Rural Districts of Mazandaran Province
Galugah County